Floating man is the proper translation of the verb "yahwā in al-Nafs," which means "to fall down." Flying man is another term used cohesively to describe a floating man. According to Ibn Sina, it is considered a thought experiment to determine if the soul exists or not. This is an argument to determine if there is consciousness.

Background
It has been said that Ibn Sina wrote the argument while imprisoned in the castle of Fardajan in the Iranian province of Hamadan. He concluded that the soul is immaterial and substantial. He also claimed that all humans could not deny their consciousness and awareness. According to Ibn Sina, the floating man could attain the concept of being without any sense experience.

Using his high knowledge, Ibn Sina saved one of the Iranian rulers, Shams al-Dawla, from death, which caused the envy of many of the courtiers. As a result, after the death of Shams al-Dawla, Ibn Sina was arrested and imprisoned in a castle between the Iranian provinces of Hamadan and Isfahan. The name of that castle is recorded in the old books as "Fardjan," "Mazdjan," or "Mazdavan." It has been said that Ibn Sina wrote the floating man argument while imprisoned in this castle.

Ibn Sina's tomb was placed in the province of Hamadan and called "Aramgah Boo Ali Sina." Every year, this place is visited by many tourists from all over the world. The building of his tomb is a fusion of two architectural styles of ancient Iran and post-Islamic Iran. Elements of traditional Iranian architecture have been used in the design of this collection. Elements such as the tower, inspired by Qaboos dome tower, gardens influenced by Iranian garden styles, water features inspired by the ponds of traditional houses, and facades with massive and rough Khara stones, decorated with Alvand mountain granite, and the diagram of ancient Iranian palaces.

According to Ahmed Alwishah, "We assert that anyone among us must convince himself that he is created simultaneously and in its entirety. However, his eyes are shielded from the outside world, and his limbs are separate and do not touch or meet. He is also said to be created floating in the air or a vacuum so that the air's substance does not collide with him and prevents him from perceiving." 

Additionally, according to Ahmed Alwishah, he considers whether he affirms his existence. Because of this, he will claim his presence without any hesitation, but he will not also establish the existence of his limb extremities, internal organs, heart, or anything else that is not a part of him. Instead, he will declare that his essence exists without claiming that it is long, wide, or profound.

Concept

The floating man argument is concerned with one who falls freely in the air. This subject knows himself, but not through any sense perception data. Floating or suspending refers to a state in which the subject thinks on the basis of his own reflection without any assistance from sense perception or any material body. This mind flutters over the abyss of eternity.

The Floating Man argument that is known today is the product of three distinct yet related versions. In the early days of its creation, Sina attempts to prove the dissociability of a consciousness and its physical body. In doing so, this initial version focuses on the principle of existential separability, the self and its ability to conceptualize its existence. In an attempt to solidify his argument, Sina expands his argument into what is known as the second version. In this updated version, Sina creates a new ideology, namely conceptual separability, which details that because the body and self are perceptible, one is able to conceptualize the self without the associated bodily parts. In the final edition of his argument, Sina brings into question self-awareness and the continuity of consciousness.

Ibn Sina states that that the eyes are the only thing preventing them from seeing anything externally, and he further describes that the floating man is created in the air, like a vacuum. Thus, this is to make sure that nothing was to overlap, allowing him the form to continue connecting with no issues. Additionally, he suggests that his extremities are separate and not interlocked. Therefore, since they are separate, Ibn Sina believes that he has no consciousness of his limbs, innards, heart or anything external to him that is truly there. Although He won't know his exact length, breadth, or depth, he will be aware of the existence of his essence. Even if he were to be conscious of his extremities, for instance, he still would perceive them as an essence of a condition of his essence. Therefore, he is warned and instructed to pay attention to the existence of his soul as something separate from his body and immaterial.

Existential Separability 
This form of separability concentrates on the unavoidable truth that exists within the self. The concept deals with the affirmation of the self, independent of anything - a certainty that exists naturally. Sina uses the word ānniyya to describe individual existence or quiddity, and declares its independence from the physical realm. Sina asserts the intrinsic essence of the ānniyya, regardless of its quantitative and qualitative characteristics.

Conceptual Separability 
This version of separability expands on the ability to conceptualize the body and to conceive the self as a separate entity accordingly. When defining the ānniyya as a separate entity from the body, Sina believes it is essential to distinguish the external limbs and parts from the internal organs, specifically the brain. This is primarily due to the impossibility of determining whether the self would even be conceivable without the brain as a vessel. Sina argues that there must be a relationship between the intellect and the brain. However, none between the self and sensory stimuli or the external body.

The Immediateness and Constancy of Self-Awareness 
Sina argues that the self is immediate and is determined by no preceding action or activity. He states that no measure or operation could produce self-awareness. Similarly, Sina proclaims the continuity of self-awareness and that there is never a point at which the mind unaware of itself. He insists that a circumstance whereupon the absolute state of self-awareness would be interrupted, is impossible.

Premises of the argument
According to Ibn Sina, we cannot deny the consciousness of the self. His argument is as follows:

We can deconstruct Ibn Sīnā’s Floating Man argument into the following points:

1. The Floating Man is conscious of the existence of his soul without being conscious of the existence of his body. 

2. The Floating Man validates the existence of his soul without validating the existence of his body. 

3. When the Floating Man is taken out of his body; all that is left is his soul, which is validated in itself.

Therefore, one may determine that: 

4. Rejecting the existence of his soul is unimaginable, since it is necessary for his existence. 

5. Rejecting the existence of his body is plausible, since it is not necessary condition to validate his existence. 

6. Following the points 4 and 5: validating the existence of the soul without validating the existence of the body is plausible. 

This argument relies on an introspective thought experiment. We have to suppose a man who comes into existence fully developed and formed, but he does not have any relation with sensory experience of the world or of his own body. There is no physical contact with the external world at all. According to Ibn Sina, this subject is, nonetheless, necessarily conscious of himself. In other words, such a being possesses the awareness of his own existence. He thereby believes that the soul has an unmediated and reflexive knowledge of its own existence. Thus appealing to self-consciousness, Ibn Sina tries to prove the existence of soul, or Nafs. Some scholars like Wisnovsky believe that the flying man argument proved the substantiality of the soul. Ibn Sina believes that innate awareness is completely independent of sensory experience.

Dualist Perspective 
Dualism affirms that mental states are not physical, nor are they correlated in any way. Ibn Sīnā’s Floating Man is a dualist argument. In other words, this thought experiment supports the ideology that there is a mental realm separate from the physical world and body. In the argument of the floating man, Sina affirms the existence of the mental self, without any physical perception. Many dualist philosophers have used this thought experiment to confirm the essence of the soul and other arguments of dualist origin.

Floating man and Descartes's Cogito 
Before the French philosopher Descartes (1596–1650) pointed out the existence of the conscious self as a turning point in epistemology, using the phrase "Cogito ergo sum," known as "I think, therefore I am" in modern english translation, the 11th century Islamic philosopher Ibn Sina had referred to the existence of consciousness in the flying man argument. Thus, long before Descartes, Ibn Sina had established an argument for the existence of knowledge by presence without any need for the existence of the body.

There are two stances on the relationship between the arguments of Ibn Sina and Descartes. Some scholars believe that there are apparent similarities between the floating man and Descartes' cogito. Others consider these similarities trivial and superficial. Both Ibn Sina and Descartes believed that the soul and self are something other than sense data. Also, Ibn Sina believed that there is no relation logically between the self and the body. In other words, there is no logical dependency between them.

Criticism 
Adamson thinks that the weakness in the argument is that, even if the flying man would be self-aware, the thought experiment does not prove that the soul is something distinct from the body. One could argue that self-awareness is seated in the mind. In this case, in being self-aware the flying man is only aware because of his mind that is doing the experiencing, not because of a distinct soul. He just does not realize that the self-awareness is a property of his nervous system.  

This argument is not supported by the concept of substance in metaphysics. This experiential field shows that the self is not consequently a substance and thereby there is no subjectivity.

See also
 Islamic philosophy
 Sensory deprivation
 Duality (mathematics)
 Mind–body dualism
 Property dualism
 Soul dualism

References

Bibliography

External links

https://www.sid.ir/fa/journal/SearchPaperlight.aspx?str=%D8%A7%D8%A8%D9%86%20%D8%B3%DB%8C%D9%86%D8%A7
https://www.cofelink.com/wp-content/uploads/2015/10/%D8%A7%D8%A8%D9%86-%D8%B3%DB%8C%D9%86%D8%A7.pdf

https://www.sid.ir/fa/journal/SearchPaperlight.aspx?str=%D8%A7%D8%A8%D9%86%20%D8%B3%DB%8C%D9%86%D8%A7

Ahmed Alwishah, Journal of Islamic Philosophy 9 (2013): 49–71 

Avicenna
Thought experiments in philosophy